The 22nd Academy of Country Music Awards ceremony was held on April 6, 1987, at Knott's Berry Farm, Buena Park, California. it was hosted by The Judds and Patrick Duffy.

Winners and nominees 
Winners are shown in bold.

References 

Academy of Country Music Awards
Academy of Country Music Awards
Academy of Country Music Awards
Academy of Country Music Awards
Academy of Country Music Awards